The 2020–21 Vancouver Canucks season was the 51st season for the National Hockey League franchise that was established on May 22, 1970.

Due to the Canada–United States border restrictions brought in as a result of the COVID-19 pandemic, the Canucks were re-aligned with the other six Canadian franchises into the newly-formed North Division. The league's 56 game season was played entirely within the new divisions, meaning that Vancouver and the other Canadian teams played an all-Canadian schedule for the 2020–21 regular season as well as the first two rounds of the 2021 Stanley Cup playoffs.

On March 31, 2021, the first of several Canucks games were postponed due to COVID protocols. By April, a majority of the team had tested positive for COVID-19, including several coaches. It is the most extensive COVID outbreak in the NHL and in North American professional sports to date. The Canucks were eliminated from playoff contention on May 10 after the Edmonton Oilers defeated the Montreal Canadiens 4–3 in overtime.

Standings

Divisional standings

Schedule and results

Regular season
The regular season schedule was released on December 23, 2020.

Detailed records

Player statistics

Skaters

Goaltenders

†Denotes player spent time with another team before joining the Canucks. Stats reflect time with the Canucks only.
‡Denotes player was traded mid-season. Stats reflect time with the Canucks only.
Bold/italics denotes franchise record.

Awards and honours

Milestones

Transactions
The Canucks have been involved in the following transactions during the 2020–21 season.

Trades

Free agents

Waivers

Contract terminations

Retirement

Signings

Draft picks

Below are the Vancouver Canucks' selections at the 2020 NHL Entry Draft, which was held virtually via video conference call on October 6 and 7, 2020 from the NHL Network studios in Secaucus, New Jersey, due to the COVID-19 pandemic.

Notes:
 The Vancouver Canucks' first-round pick went to the New Jersey Devils as the result of a trade on February 16, 2020 that sent Blake Coleman to Tampa Bay in exchange for Nolan Foote and this pick (being conditional at the time of the trade). The condition – New Jersey will receive a first-round pick in 2020 if Vancouver qualifies for the 2020 Stanley Cup playoffs – was converted when the Canucks advanced to the First Round of the playoffs on August 7, 2020.
Tampa Bay previously acquired this pick in a trade on June 22, 2019 that sent J. T. Miller to Vancouver in exchange for Marek Mazanec, a third-round pick in 2019 and this pick.
 The Vancouver Canucks' second-round pick went to the Detroit Red Wings as the result of a trade on October 7, 2020 that sent Edmonton's second-round pick in 2020 (45th overall) to Los Angeles in exchange for a fourth-round pick in 2020 (97th overall) and this pick.
Los Angeles previously acquired this pick as the result of a trade on February 17, 2020 that sent Tyler Toffoli to Vancouver in exchange for Tim Schaller, Tyler Madden, a conditional fourth-round pick in 2022 and this pick.
 The Anaheim Ducks' seventh-round pick went to the Vancouver Canucks as the result of a trade on January 16, 2019 that sent Michael Del Zotto to Anaheim in exchange for Luke Schenn and this pick.
 The Vancouver Canucks' seventh-round pick went to the San Jose Sharks as the result of a trade on October 7, 2020 that sent a fifth-round pick in 2020 (127th overall) to the New York Rangers in exchange for a seventh-round pick in 2020 (196th overall) and this pick.
The Rangers previously acquired this pick as the result of a trade on February 12, 2019 that sent Marek Mazanec to Vancouver in exchange for this pick.

Notes

References

Vancouver Canucks seasons
Vancouver Canucks
Canucks